Meet Me on Cassiopeia is a 1951 Danish musical film directed by . The story is about a Muse played by Bodil Kjer interfering in a contemporary theater production, who gets as inspired by Earthly life as she inspires them. The musical was a big hit in Denmark at the time, but is probably best remembered for several top hits written for it, many of which still gets modern covers made of them; among others Den allersidste dans (The Very Last Dance) and Musens sang (The Song of the Muse).

Cast 
 Bodil Kjer as The Muse Polyhymnia
 Lily Broberg as Irene Berger
 Hans Kurt as John Berger
 Poul Reichhardt as Lieutenant Harry Smith
 Ellen Gottschalch as Rosa Ellias
 Johannes Meyer as Zeus
 Ib Schønberg as Volmer
 John Price as Professor Ørnfeldt
 Knud Heglund as Head Waiter Mortensen
 Edith Hermansen as Mrs. Larsen
 Per Buckhøj as Man in control tower
 Keld Markuslund as Waiter Christiansen
 Bjørn Spiro as Dancer
 
 Svend Bille as Stage hand
 Ego Brønnum-Jacobsen as Police officer
 Anna Henriques-Nielsen as Mrs. Larsen
 Thorkil Lauritzen as Inspector

References

External links 
 

1951 films
1951 musical films
Danish musical films
1950s Danish-language films
Danish black-and-white films
Films produced by Erik Balling